List of Ireland women's national rugby union players is a list of women who have played for the Ireland national rugby union team.

Note the list only includes women who have played in a Test match which only includes the matches listed in this page List of recognised Ireland test matches

This is an incomplete list as many teamsheets are not available for matches played prior to 2004.

References

 
Rugby union
Irish rugby union lists